David Feao (born 6 October 1990) is a rugby union player who plays at prop for Tonga. He has previously played for Leicester Tigers in England's Premiership Rugby.

Family and early life
David Feao was born in Brisbane, Australia. He attended Brisbane State High School and was selected for the Australian Schoolboys rugby team in 2008. Faeo played his club rugby for Souths in Brisbane.

Rugby career
As a 19-year-old, Feao played in the 2009 Queensland Premier Rugby grand final for Souths Rugby Club, where the team was runner-up to Brothers. The following year he played for the Tonga U-20 team at the 2010 Junior World Championship.

In 2014, Feao was selected for Tonga A in the Pacific Rugby Cup. Later that season  he played for the  team that won Australia's inaugural National Rugby Championship. He transferred to the NSW Country Eagles in 2015 before signing a short-term contract with French club La Rochelle, initially for the final three months of the 2015–16 season, then extended for a further season.

He played for the Pro D2 side, Narbonne as a medical joker from January 2018, before joining Leicester Tigers in August 2018. Feao made his Leicester debut on 1 September 2019 against Exeter Chiefs, and scored his only try for the club in a 2018-19 Premiership Rugby Cup defeat against Saracens on 28 October 2018.  On 15 May 2019 he was announced as one of the players to leave Leicester following the end of the 2018-19 Premiership Rugby season.

References

External links
 
 

1990 births
Australian rugby union players
Living people
Brisbane City (rugby union) players
New South Wales Country Eagles players
Rugby union props
Australian sportspeople of Tongan descent
Australian expatriate rugby union players
Australian expatriate sportspeople in France
Expatriate rugby union players in France
Leicester Tigers players
Tonga international rugby union players
Stade Rochelais players
RC Narbonne players
Queensland Reds players
Rugby union players from Brisbane